The second election to Lothian Regional Council was held on 2 May 1978 and saw Labour gaining a majority of the council's 49 seats amidst a Labour surge across Scotland. Stephen Maxwell, the SNP's vice-chairman, was a prominent victim of the Labour gains, losing his seat of Slateford/Hailes.

Aggregate results

Ward results

References

Lothian
1978